Mill Glacier is a tributary glacier,  wide, flowing northwest between the Dominion Range and the Supporters Range into Beardmore Glacier, Antarctica. It was discovered by the British Antarctic Expedition, 1907–09, and named for Hugh Robert Mill, a British geographer and Antarctic historian.

See also
 List of glaciers in the Antarctic

References

Glaciers of Dufek Coast